An American Dilemma: The Negro Problem and Modern Democracy is a 1944 study of race relations authored by Swedish economist Gunnar Myrdal and funded by Carnegie Corporation of New York. The foundation chose Myrdal because it thought that as a non-American, he could offer a more unbiased opinion. Myrdal's volume, at nearly 1,500 pages, painstakingly detailed what he saw as obstacles to full participation in American society that American blacks faced as of the 1940s. American political scientist, diplomat, and author, Ralph Bunche—who was the first African American to receive a Nobel Prize—served as Gunnar Myrdal's main researcher and writer at the start of the project in the fall of 1938.

It sold over 100,000 copies and went through 25 printings before going into its second edition in 1965. It was enormously influential in how racial issues were viewed in the United States, and it was cited in the landmark Brown v. Board of Education case "in general".  The book was generally positive in its outlook on the future of race relations in America, taking the view that democracy would triumph over racism. In many ways it laid the groundwork for future policies of racial integration and affirmative action.

Analysis 
Myrdal believed he saw a vicious cycle in which whites oppressed blacks, leading to poor standards of education, health, morality, etc. among blacks that was then used as justification for prejudice and discrimination. The way out of this cycle, he argued, was to either reduce white prejudice, which would improve the circumstances of blacks, or to improve the circumstances of blacks, which would then reduce the reasons for white prejudice. Myrdal called this process the "principle of cumulation".

In Black-White Relations: The American Dilemma, economist Junfu Zhang gives this description of Myrdal's work:

Myrdal, writing before the civil rights movement of the 1950s and 1960s, alleged that northern whites were generally ignorant of the situation facing Negro citizens, and noted that "to get publicity is of the highest strategic importance to the Negro people". Given the press's pivotal role in the movement, this proved to be strikingly prescient.

American Creed 
At the center of Myrdal's work in An American Dilemma was his postulate that political and social interaction in the United States is shaped by an "American Creed". This creed emphasizes the ideals of individualism, civil liberties, and equality of opportunity.  Myrdal claims that it is the "American Creed" that keeps the diverse melting pot of the United States together.  It is the common belief in this creed that endows all people—whites, blacks, rich, poor, male, female, and immigrants alike—with a common cause and allows them to co-exist as one nation.

Reception 
The United States Supreme Court’s decision to cite to Myrdal’s book exposed it to ridicule in the South. For example, the Chief Justice of the Supreme Court of Florida declared that, in the case of Brown v. Board of Education, “the Supreme Court abandoned the Constitution, precedent and common sense and fortified its decision solely with the writings of Gunner Myrdal, a Scandinavian sociologist. What he knew about constitutional law we are not told nor have we been able to learn.”

American Marxist historian Herbert Aptheker wrote a booklet titled The Negro People in America: A Critique of Gunnar Myrdal’s “An American Dilemma” arguing the work contained "numerous and serious misstatements of fact" and was "based upon a fallacious philosophic concept."

In a 1944 review, political scientist Harold F. Gosnell described Myrdal's book as "an outstanding social science treatise, brilliant, stimulating, and provocative."

Author Mark Tushnet captured in his book the NAACP's comment that the information in the book isn't something new for the African American communities while acknowledging what the country needed is public and legal discourse for the social inequality and racial discrimination cases.

See also 
 "Occasional Discourse on the Negro Question"

References

Further reading 
 Herbert Aptheker, The Negro People in America: A Critique of Gunnar Myrdal's "An American Dilemma." New York: International Publishers, 1946.
 Ralph Ellison. "An American Dilemma: A Review" (1944)
 Eric Foner and John A. Garraty.  The Reader's Companion to American History, Houghton Mifflin Company.
  Nikhil Pal Singh,  Black is a country: race and the unfinished struggle for democracy (2004)
 An American Dilemma at The Internet Archive

1944 non-fiction books
American non-fiction books
Sociology books
Politics and race in the United States
Books about African-American history
Harper & Brothers books
Race in the United States
Anti-black racism in the United States
Andrew Carnegie
Books about the United States written by foreigners